J. Roger Hindley is a prominent British logician best known for the Hindley–Milner type inference algorithm.  Since 1998, he has been an Honorary Research Fellow at Swansea University.

Education
Hindley graduated in 1960 from Queen's University Belfast, remaining to earn a M.Sc. in 1961.

He went on to receive a Ph.D. in 1964 from University of Newcastle upon Tyne, where his thesis supervisor was Ronald Harrop.  Later, he returned to Queen's University for a D.Sc. in 1991. 

He taught at Penn State University (1964-1966), Bristol University (1966-1968), and has been at Swansea University since 1968.

Selected publications 

.

.

References 

 

Living people
British logicians
1939 births
British philosophers